The 2021 Peru Cup season, the largest amateur tournament of Peruvian football. The Regional Stage starts in October, and the National Stage starts in November. The winner of the National Stage was promoted to the Liga 1 and the runner-up was promoted to the Liga 2.

Departmental stage
The following list shows the teams that qualified for the Regional Stage.

Regional Stage

Fase 1 - Regional
The round was be played between 3 October and 6 October, on a home-and-away two-legged tie.

|-
|}

Fase 2 - Interregional
The round was be played on 10 October 2021, in a single knock-out match format.

|-

|-
|}

Fase 3 - Interregional
The round was be played on 14 October 2021, in a single knock-out match format.

|}

National Stage

Fase 4

Round 1

Round 2

Round 3

Round 4

Round 5

Round 6

Round 7

Fase 5

Preliminary round

Semifinals

Final

Top goalscorers

See also
 2021 Liga 1
 2021 Liga 2

External links
 Official Website
  Dechalaca Copa Peru
  Semanario Pasión

2021
Peru
2021 in Peruvian football